Vladimirovac is a village in Serbia. It is situated in the Alibunar municipality, in the South Banat District, Vojvodina province. The village has a Serb ethnic majority and a population of 4,111 people (2002 census).

Name
In Serbian, the village is known as Vladimirovac or Владимировац; in Romanian as Pătrovăsâla or/also spelled "Petrovăsâla;" in German as Petersdorf; and in Hungarian as Petre.

Ethnic groups (2002 census)
Serbs = 2,259 (54,95%)
Romanians = 1,424 (34.63%)
Roma = 110 (2.67%)
others.

Historical population

Sites
The present church was built from 1859 to 1863; on 8 December 1894. a railway station for rail Vršac - Kovin was opened; and on 26 August 1896, the Pančevo was opened as well.

Notable people
Dejan Dražić, footballer
Baba Anujka, serial killer

See also
List of places in Serbia
List of cities, towns and villages in Vojvodina

References

Gallery

External links

Official page of Vladimirovac
Canadian Webpage

Populated places in South Banat District
Populated places in Serbian Banat
Alibunar